The former Glenn H. Brown Liquid Crystal Institute (LCI) at Kent State University is now renamed the Advanced Materials and Liquid Crystal Institute. The AMLCI is a center of study for liquid crystal technology and education, blending basic and applied research on liquid crystals. This approach has resulted in technological advances and new applications such as display tablets, optical shutters, variable transmission windows, projection display devices, and flexible displays. Established in 1965, the institute is now directed by Dr. Torsten Hegmann and is housed at KSU's Liquid Crystal and Materials Sciences building, completed in 1996.

The LCI is home to the Chemical Physics Interdisciplinary Program, which offers masters and Ph.D. studies in the physics and chemistry of liquid crystals and their applications. The program is open to incoming students with degrees in physics, chemistry, engineering, and materials science.

Directors
There have been five directors of the Liquid Crystal Institute.

Glenn H. Brown (1965 - 1983)
Dr. Glenn H. Brown founded the Liquid Crystal Institute in 1965. In 1986 the Kent State University Board of Trustees honored him by naming the institute after him.

J. William Doane (1983 - 1996)
John L. West (1996 - 2003, 2016 - 2019)
Oleg D. Lavrentovich (2003 - 2011)
Hiroshi Yokoyama (2011 - 2016)
Torsten Hegmann (2019–Present)

References

External links
AMLCI Home

Kent State University
Liquid crystals
1965 establishments in Ohio